Atli Barkarson (born 19 March 2001) is an Icelandic professional footballer who plays as a left-back for Danish Superliga club SønderjyskE and the Iceland national team.

Club career
Atli joined the youth academy of Völsungur in 2012 and was promoted to the first team in 2017. He made seven appearances and scored two goals in the 3. deild karla that season.

On 2 September 2017, Atli joined the youth team of Norwich City of the English Championship. After playing for the club's under-18 team for the first year, he signed his first professional contract on 30 June 2018. In August 2019, Atli left the club to join Fredrikstad FK of the Norwegian First Division. During his short stint with the club, he made three league appearances.

In 2020, Atli returned to Iceland and signed for Víkingur Reykjavík of the Úrvalsdeild.  He appeared in the team's single 2020–21 UEFA Europa League match, a 1–2 elimination defeat to NK Olimpija Ljubljana of the Slovenia PrivaLiga.

On 27 January 2022, it was confirmed that Atli had joined Danish Superliga club SønderjyskE on a deal until June 2026.

International career
Atli was called up to the senior national team for a friendlies against Uganda and South Korea in January 2022. He made his senior international debut as a starter in the first match, an eventual 1–1 draw, on 12 January 2022.

International career statistics

References

External links

2001 births
Living people
Atli Barkarson
Atli Barkarson
Association football defenders
Norwich City F.C. players
Fredrikstad FK players
Knattspyrnufélagið Víkingur players
SønderjyskE Fodbold players
Norwegian Second Division players
Úrvalsdeild karla (football) players
Atli Barkarson
Sportspeople from Reykjavík
Atli Barkarson
Expatriate footballers in Norway
Atli Barkarson
Expatriate footballers in England
Atli Barkarson
Expatriate men's footballers in Denmark
Atli Barkarson
Atli Barkarson
Atli Barkarson
Atli Barkarson